Jaak is a version of the names Jacob and James in the Estonian language.

People named Jaak include:
Jaak Aab (born 1960), Estonian politician
Jaak Aaviksoo (born 1954), Estonian politician and physicists
Jaak Allik (born 1946), Estonian politician and theatre director
Jaak De Boever (born 1937), Belgian racing cyclist
Jaak Boon (born 1948), Belgian television writer, director and producer
Jaak Gabriëls (born 1943), Belgian politician
Jaak Huimerind (born 1957), Estonian architect
Jaak-Heinrich Jagor (born 1990), Estonian hurdler
Jaak Herodes (born 1944), Estonian politician
Jaak Joala (1950–2014), Estonian singer
Jaak Jõerüüt (born 1947), Estonian writer and politician
Jaak Juske (born 1976), Estonian politician 
Jaak Kangilaski (1939–2022), Estonian art historian and educator
Jaak Kärner (1892–1937), Estonian sport shooter
Jaak Kilmi (born 1973), Estonian film director and producer
Jaak Leimann (born 1941), Estonian economist and politician
Jaak-Nicolaas Lemmens (1823–1881), Belgian organist and composer
Jaak Lipso (born 1940), Estonian basketball player
Jaak Madison (born 1991), Estonian politician
Jaak Mae (born 1972), Estonian cross-country skier
Jaak Panksepp (1943–2017), Estonian-American psychologist, psychobiologist and neuroscientist
Jaak Peetre (1935–2019), Estonian-Swedish mathematician
Jaak Põldma (born 1988), Estonian tennis player
Jaak Prints (born 1981), Estonian actor
Jaak Salumets (born 1949), Estonian basketball player and coach
Jaak Tamleht (1942-1986), Estonian actor
Jaak Urmet, better known as Wimberg (born 1979), Estonian poet and writer
Jaak Uudmäe (born 1954), Estonian triple jumper
Jaak Valge (born 1955), Estonian historian and politician
Jaak van Velthoven (born 1951), Belgian motocross rider
Jaak van Wijck (1870–1946), Dutch painter

See also
Kristjan Jaak Peterson (1801–1822), Estonian poet

References

Estonian masculine given names